Mike Mersch (September 29, 1964 - October 13, 2000) was an American professional ice hockey defenseman.

Mersch played five seasons of professional hockey in the International Hockey League (IHL), registering 23 goals, 109 assist, 132 points, 614 penalty minutes, in 328 games played. He retired following the 1990–91 season.

His son, Michael Mersch, is a 2011 draft pick of the Los Angeles Kings.

References

External links
 

1964 births
2000s deaths
American men's ice hockey defensemen
Deaths from cancer in the United States
Flint Spirits players
Ice hockey players from Illinois
Muskegon Lumberjacks players
New Haven Nighthawks players
People from Skokie, Illinois
Salt Lake Golden Eagles (IHL) players
UIC Flames men's ice hockey players
Year of death missing